Marot (Punjabi) is a city in Bahawalnagar District in Punjab, Pakistan. This city is situated at the border of India and Pakistan. This city is situated 50 km from Fortabbas, 160 km from Bahawalnagar and 100 km from Bahawalpur. The population of the city is estimated 20,000, with some 280,000 in the entire district. It contains some notable forts such as Marot Fort, Jaamgarh, Mojgarh and Meergarh.

Mostly people are farmers in the area and the major crops are wheat, cotton, mustard and sugar cane.

The spoken languages are Punjabi And Urdu.

Gallery

References

Bahawalnagar District
Populated places in Bahawalnagar District